Dimethyl sulfone (DMSO2) is an organosulfur compound with the formula (CH3)2SO2. It is also known by several other names including methyl sulfone and (especially in alternative medicine) methylsulfonylmethane (MSM). This colorless solid features the sulfonyl functional group and is the simplest of the sulfones. It is relatively inert chemically and is able to resist decomposition at elevated temperatures. It occurs naturally in some primitive plants, is present in small amounts in many foods and beverages, and is marketed (under the MSM name) as a dietary supplement. It is sometimes used as a cutting agent for illicitly manufactured methamphetamine. It is also commonly found in the atmosphere above marine areas, where it is used as a carbon source by the airborne bacteria Afipia. Oxidation of dimethyl sulfoxide produces the sulfone, both under laboratory conditions and metabolically.

Use as a solvent
Because of its polarity and thermal stability, molten DMSO2 has been used industrially as a high-temperature solvent. For example, displacement of aryl chlorides by potassium fluoride has been conducted in the liquid.

With a pKa of 31, the sulfone can be deprotonated with sodium amide. The conjugate base has been used as a nucleophile.

Pharmacology and toxicity
Nuclear magnetic resonance (NMR) studies have demonstrated that oral doses of MSM are absorbed into the blood and cross the blood/brain barrier. An NMR study has also found detectable levels of MSM normally present in the blood and cerebrospinal fluid, suggesting that it derives from dietary sources, intestinal bacterial metabolism, and the body's endogenous methanethiol metabolism.

Medical and dietary use
Although no medical uses for MSM have been approved, a variety of health benefits have been claimed and studied. Stanley W. Jacob reported having administered MSM to over 18,000 patients with a variety of ailments; he co-authored a book promoting MSM with a variety of claims, including a utility as a natural source of "biologically active sulfur," suggesting that people are deficient in such forms of sulfur in their dietary intake. There is no Dietary Reference Intake (DRI) or Daily Value established for sulfur but notable dietary sources include cruciferous vegetables, garlic, onions, asafoetida, legumes, nuts, seeds, plant milk, animal milk and eggs (whites and yolks).

The claims for the need for sulfur supplementation originate with Robert Herschler, a biochemist who patented "Dietary and pharmaceutical uses of methylsulfonylmethane and compositions comprising it" in 1982. He claimed that MSM was useful in stress, mucous-membrane inflammation, allergies and gastrointestinal conditions.

Moreover, in cases involving topical therapeutics, the role of MSM as an active agent, per se, versus its having a role in promoting skin permeation (in manner, akin to its solvent relative DMSO) must be characterized/controlled.
The biochemical effects of supplemental methylsulfonylmethane are poorly understood. Some researchers have suggested that MSM has anti-inflammatory effects. 
The spectrum of biological effects of dimethyl sulfoxide (DMSO) and MSM differ, but those of DMSO may be mediated, at least in part, by MSM.

U.S. FDA action
In July 2007 a manufacturer of MSM submitted a notification to the U.S. FDA claiming generally recognized as safe (GRAS) status. GRAS status is for safety, and has no evaluation of efficacy. The FDA responded in February 2008 with a letter of non-objection, functionally designating OptiMSM, the branded form of MSM, as GRAS. The designation allows MSM to be added to meal supplement and meal replacement foods, fruit smoothie-type drinks, fruit-flavored thirst quencher-type beverages, and food bars such as granola bars and energy-type bars.

Evidence from clinical trials
Small-scale studies of possible treatments with MSM have been conducted on both animals and humans. These studies of MSM have suggested some benefits, particularly for treatment of oxidative stress and osteoarthritis, but evidence for other uses is lacking. Natural Medicines Comprehensive Database contains a continually updated list of health-related MSM studies.

Cancer

A South Korean study focussing on the role of MSM affecting growth factors associated with breast cancer identifies MSM to have multiple targets, both in vitro and in vivo, including STAT3, STAT5b, IGF-1R and VEGF, confirming the ability of MSM to suppress tumor initiation, growth and metastasis in a dose dependent manner. The expression of triple negative hormone receptors is also down regulated by MSM. In a xenograft model the mice showed inhibited tumor cell migration and suppressed tumor growth in a dose dependent manner when receiving MSM as part of their drinking water at nul, three or five percent MSM weight over volume. The authors strongly recommend MSM as a trial drug for treating breast cancers because of its multi-targeting mechanism.

HDL Cholesterol
A small 2021 Randomized Controlled Trial on cardiometabolic markers found a possible relationship between a daily dose of 3 g of MSM and high-density lipoprotein (HDL) levels on overweight and obese people. The MSM group demonstrated higher HDL levels after 16 weeks (51.8 ± 2.8 mg/dL) when compared to the baseline (44.9 ± 3.7 mg/dL) and also versus the placebo group (42.7 ± 2.5 mg/dL at baseline vs 48.0 ± 4.9 mg/DL at 16 weeks). Other markers (inflammation, fasting glucose, resting heart rate, etc.) showed no significant changes between baseline and 16 weeks on either the placebo or the MSM groups with the exception of C-reactive protein levels, which were higher on the placebo group than on the MSM group at baseline and continued to increase up to the 16 weeks mark while showing a very slight decrease on the MSM group. However, the authors state they cannot explain why CRP levels were higher on the placebo group nor whether MSM may play a stabilizing role on CRP. The authors also state more and larger studies are required to establish the relationship between MSM and HDL.

Safety
The  of MSM is greater than 17.5 grams per kilogram of body weight. In rats, no adverse events were observed after daily doses of 2 g MSM per kg of body weight. In a 90-day follow-up study, rats received daily MSM doses of 1.5 g/kg, and no changes were observed in terms of symptoms, blood chemistry or gross pathology.

Extensive research in animal models indicates MSM has a very low toxicity when administered both orally and topically.

In clinical trials, several studies reported minimal or absence of side effects after 12 weeks of dosing. Reported side effects from these studies included mild gastrointestinal issues, fatigue, and headache, although they did not appear to differ from placebo. A more recent 26-week study on large joint osteoarthritis observed no adverse events or abnormal changes in lab monitoring when taking 6 grams MSM per day. MSM is considered 'Possibly Safe' at therapeutic doses, although further research is still needed to assess its safety for long-term use.

Osteoarthritis
A review of two small randomized controlled trials of methylsulfonylmethane in osteoarthritis (OA) knee pain relief "reported significant improvement in pain outcomes in the treatment group compared to comparator treatments; however, methodological issues and concerns over optimal dosage and treatment period were highlighted." The two trials included 168 people, of whom 52 received MSM, either 1.5 g/day or 6.0 g/day. The review authors stated: "No definitive conclusion can currently be drawn" and there is "no definitive evidence that MSM is superior to placebo in the treatment of mild to moderate osteoarthritis of the knee."

Subsequent to the 2008 review there have been two more clinical trials : 
 One was a double-blind, randomized, placebo controlled trial with 49 participants taking 1.125 g of MSM or placebo three times daily for 12 weeks. The results showed a significant decrease in WOMAC physical function and total WOMAC scores, as well as improvement in VAS pain scores. The effect size of MSM supplementation was slightly lower than that of NSAID use as reported in other clinical trials. The authors wrote "longer-term trials may yield additional and greater improvements." 
 The second used 6.0 g/day versus placebo for 26 weeks. Subjects were evaluated through the WOMAC questionnaire, SF-36 Quality of Life survey, and Global Assessments for OA symptoms from both patients and physicians. WOMAC results showed significant improvements in all areas for the MSM group. The MSM group also showed a strong trend towards changes in disease status. Careful lab monitoring of health indicators showed no side effects of MSM supplementation and no adverse events were reported.

Synergism of methylsulfonylmethane and glucosamine and chondroitin
There are findings from Indian researchers that show an improvement of symptoms like pain, inflammation and swelling in patients by a combined intake of MSM and glucosamine. Two other studies investigated the effects of MSM in combination with glucosamine and chondroitin (GC) on joint function. In the first study, the GC+MSM group saw significant benefits sooner than the GC group. This suggests that the addition of MSM reduces the time to benefit. In another, the GC+MSM group saw significant improvements in both WOMAC and VAS pain scores when compared to both the placebo group and GC group. This suggests that the addition of MSM increases the magnitude of benefits.

Skin, hair, nails
The first scientific investigation of MSM for skin health was published in 2015. The RCT used a 3g per day dose and included only 20 women. Results showed significant improvements in the number and severity of facial wrinkles, firmness, tone and texture. Another study evaluated doses of 1g and 3g and showed improvements in wrinkles, firmness, and hydration at both dose levels in 20 persons. The same author published a study on MSM for hair and nails from the same clinical trial. The results showed improvements in hair shine, volume, and appearance, and nail shine and appearance. An Italian study evaluated the effects of a nutraceutical composed of MSM, hyaluronic acid, and L-carnosine. The results from RCT showed broad improvements in facial skin hydration and elasticity, as well as decreased sebaceous secretions.

Oxidative stress and inflammation
Multiple human and animal trials indicate MSM may reduce oxidative stress and inflammation. In one small human trial, MSM has been shown to protect muscles from damage by reducing the amount of oxidative stress damage incurred through exercise. In a second small trial the total antioxidant capacity was significantly increased after taking MSM. Studies in animals indicate a hepatoprotective effect of MSM against several toxins including acetaminophen, paraquat, and carbon tetrachloride. Animal models of experimental colitis and pulmonary hypertension indicate a protective effect as well.

Allergies and immunity
Two studies have evaluated the effects of MSM on allergic rhinitis. A 2004 multi-centered, open-label clinical trial found that MSM reduced both upper and lower respiratory symptoms associated with seasonal allergic rhinitis (SAR), and increased energy levels. It found no significant changes in IgE levels, although the duration of the study was not likely long enough to see changes. An RCT evaluated three doses of MSM and found that a 3g daily dose was most effective compared to 1g or 6g per day. Daily use at 3g decreased allergy-associated symptoms, including itchy eyes, itchy nose, watery eyes, rhinorrhea, sneezing, and nasal obstruction. The 3g dose also improved peak nasal inspiratory flow (PNIF) indicating improved breathing. The study also evaluated an acute 12g dose and found significant improvements in all symptoms except itching eyes and sneezing, but not for PNIF.

MSM has been shown to improve immune function markers. RCT found that in blood samples taken after bouts of exhaustive exercise, there was a reduced response to an infectious stimulus in the placebo group, but the MSM group maintained a robust response, indicating that MSM protected against stress-induced immunosuppression. The authors postulate that MSM’s anti-inflammatory properties reduce the overstimulation of inflammatory cells during exercise, thus conserving their ability to respond to infections threats. This is supported by in vitro research showing MSM inhibits over-activation of white blood cells and has an anti-apoptotic effect.

Notes

Dietary supplements
Experimental medical treatments
Solvents
Sulfones
Food additives